BlackSky Pathfinder-1 is an Earth imaging satellite.

It is a demonstration satellite for BlackSky Global, a Seattle-based company intending to field a fleet of 60 spacecraft to offer on-demand high-resolution images of any place on the planet. The main objective of the pathfinder is to return imagery, an achievement that would prove the basic technology behind the planned commercial Earth-observing satellite fleet.

This is first in a series of 30 satellites planned to deploy the BlackSky constellation that will provide near real-time images in about 90 minutes to produce images that are more current and wide-ranging to increase global transparency.

The satellite was launched at 03:42 UTC on 26 September 2016 by Indian Space Research Organisation (ISRO) using the PSLV-C35 launch vehicle.

References 

Earth observation satellites of the United States
Spacecraft launched by PSLV rockets
Spacecraft launched in 2016
Earth imaging satellites
Commercial Earth imaging satellites
Technology demonstration satellites